Qamdo (Tibetan pinyin, used on signs), Chamdo (Tournadre western spelling), 昌都 (Pinyin: Changdu) can refer to:
 Qamdo, a prefecture-level city in Tibet Autonomous Region
 Qamdo (Chengguan), a town in Tibet Autonomous Region
 Qamdo Region, a former administrative region in western Kham, Tibet
 Qamdo Bangda Airport